Oak Hall is a historic slave plantation home located in Columbia, Howard County, Maryland

Oak Hall was built as a sister house to the Waveland Manor built by Richard Dorsey in 1809 on a land grant named New Year's Gift which contained the 1732 Dorsey Family estate Elkhorn. The brick manor house featured 19 rooms and nine fireplaces. Outbuildings included a large frame barn. The manor was located adjacent to Christ Church Guilford.

The Dorsey family remained Confederate sympathizers through the civil war, providing more militia than any other family in the state.

Oak Hall remained in good condition throughout its history, and was demolished in November 1985 for a commercial land development. Oak Hall Lane in Columbia terminates at the former location of the residence with a small commercial office complex.

See also
List of Howard County properties in the Maryland Historical Trust
Christ Church Guilford

References

Houses completed in 1809
Howard County, Maryland landmarks
Houses in Howard County, Maryland
Buildings and structures in Columbia, Maryland
Demolished buildings and structures in Maryland
Buildings and structures demolished in 1985
Plantation houses in Maryland